The 30th People's Choice Awards, honoring the best in popular culture for 2003, were held on January 11, 2004 at the Pasadena Civic Auditorium in Pasadena, California. They were hosted by Charlie Sheen and Jon Cryer, and broadcast on CBS.

This would be the last year winners would be decided by Gallup polls.

Awards
Winners are listed first, in bold.

External links
2004 People's Choice.com

People's Choice Awards
2003 awards in the United States
2004 in California
January 2004 events in the United States